The Hagenbach-Bischoff system is a variant of the D'Hondt method, used for allocating seats in party-list proportional representation. It usually uses the Hagenbach-Bischoff quota for allocating seats, and for any seats remaining the D'Hondt method is then applied so that the first and subsequent divisors (number of seats won plus 1) for each party list's vote total includes the number of seats that have been allocated by the quota. The system gives results identical to the D'Hondt method and it is often referred to as such in countries using the system e.g. Switzerland and Belgium. Luxembourg uses the Hagenbach-Bischoff method to allocate seats in its European Parliament elections.

History

While named after the Swiss physicist and electoral reformer Eduard Hagenbach-Bischoff (1833–1910), it was originated by the D'Hondt method's inventor Victor D'Hondt (1841–1901), using the simple or Hare quota. Hagenbach-Bischoff's contribution, in addition to popularizing it, was to suggest a quota that allocates the greatest possible number of seats before the D'Hondt method is used.

Variations

As used in Belgium's national parliamentary elections from 1919 to 2003 the system could be said to have existed in a two-tier form, until it was replaced by a single-tier PR system. First, the Hare rather than Hagenbach-Bischoff quota was applied in the constituencies of  provinces, and second, any seats remaining after quota allocation were aggregated, along with parties' provincial vote totals, at the provincial level where the D'Hondt method was then applied, including in the divisors for each party the number of seats it had won in the constituencies.

Sources

Carstairs, Andrew McLaren (1980): A Short History of Electoral Systems in Western Europe. London: George Allen & Unwin. 
Hoag, Clarence Gilbert and George Hervey Hallett (1926): Proportional Representation. New York: Macmillan.

Party-list proportional representation